Tarmstedt is a Samtgemeinde ("collective municipality") in the district of Rotenburg, in Lower Saxony, Germany. Its seat is in the village Tarmstedt.

The Samtgemeinde Tarmstedt consists of the following municipalities:
 Breddorf 
 Bülstedt
 Hepstedt 
 Kirchtimke
 Tarmstedt
 Vorwerk 
 Westertimke 
 Wilstedt

Samtgemeinden in Lower Saxony